Tomaz Vieira da Cruz (22 April 1900 – 7 June 1960) was a poet from Portugal.  He was also a musician and journalist.  His most well known poems are dedicated to his "bronze flower", a woman he loved.  His poetry had an Angolan flavor.  His "day job" was as a pharmacist's assistant.
He was born in Constância and died in Lisbon.

External links
Profile from Contemporary Africa Database
Tomaz Vieira da Cruz on Encyclopædia Britannica.
Tomás Vieira da Cruz on Infopédia (Portuguese)

1900 births
1960 deaths
People from Constância
20th-century Portuguese poets
Portuguese male poets
20th-century male writers